The 2018 Football West season was the fifth season under the current competition format in Western Australia. The NPL premiers Perth SC qualified for the National Premier Leagues finals series.

Pre-season changes

League Tables

2018 National Premier Leagues WA

This was the last season using a 14-team format. The bottom 3 teams (which was subject to eligibility requirements) at the end of the season were relegated to the State League 1. Perth Glory Youth was ineligible to receive prize monies in the end of season Top 4 Cup competition.

Finals
The Top Four Cup is played as a finals competition at the conclusion of the regular season.

2018 WA State League 1

The 2018 WA State League 1 was composed of 11 teams playing 20 games over a 22 round season. Rockingham City as Champions were promoted to the National Premier Leagues WA, as they met eligibility criteria. The 9th and 10th placed clubs played in a two-legged promotion/relegation playoff, whilst the last placed team (Joondalup City) were directly relegated to State League Division Two.

Promotion/relegation play-off

2018 WA State League 2

The 2018 WA State League 2 was composed of 11 teams playing 20 games over a 22 round season.

2018 Women's Premier League

The highest tier domestic football competition in Western Australia is known as the BankWest Women's Premier League for sponsorship reasons.  The 8 teams play each other three times, for a total of 21 matches over the regular season.

Top Four Cup

2018 State Cup

Western Australian soccer clubs competed in 2018 for the Football West State Cup. Clubs entered from the National Premier Leagues WA, the two divisions of the State League, a limited number of teams from various divisions of the 2018 Amateur League competition, and from regional teams from the South West, Goldfields, and Great Southern regions.

This knockout competition was won by Armadale SC, their 1st title.

The competition also served as the Western Australian Preliminary rounds for the 2018 FFA Cup. In addition to the A-League club Perth Glory, the two finalists – Armadale and Gwelup Croatia – qualified for the final rounds, entering at the Round of 32.

References

External links
Football West Official website

Soccer in Western Australia
Football West
2018